Shake the Sheets is the fourth album by the Washington, D.C. rock band Ted Leo and the Pharmacists, released in 2004 by Lookout! Records. It was the band's last album for the Lookout! label. A music video was filmed for the single "Me and Mia", a song about a friend of frontman Ted Leo who's battled an eating disorder.

Critical reception

Shake the Sheets received positive reviews from music critics. Nisha Gopalan from Entertainment Weekly wrote about the track listing, "Practically every song is a near-perfect amalgam of straight-up melodies and pogoing beats." Tim Sendra of AllMusic praised the album's stripped-down approach to its messages and instrumentation and Leo for continuing to craft strong musicianship in his vocals and lyrics, concluding with, "Fiercely political without being to specific, filled with moments that will have you jumping out of your seat with excitement, Shake the Sheets is more proof that Ted Leo & the Pharmacists are the only band that matters, punk or otherwise." Alec Hanley Bemis from Blender found criticism in Leo's fast-paced delivery causing his lyrics to feel hazy and lose energy after the first three tracks but praised his musical pastiche of '70s pub rock and '80s punk, along with "a half-dozen modern swing and shuffle rhythms", calling it "a pop-punk update on Springsteen". Jon Caramanica of Rolling Stone commended Leo for clearing up his themes and sound while remaining a vocal presence but found the attention to politics muted. Pitchfork contributor Rob Mitchum saw the record moving away from Hearts of Oaks "more aggressively percussive approach," noting the scaling back of Leo's idiosyncratic musical repertoire, the presence of backing band the Pharmacists and the political aspects of the songs being hampered by "unrepresentative cliché-driven lyrical content," but said "while disappointing, Shake the Sheets remains better than most of its current brethren in indie cryostasis."

Track listing

References

2004 albums
Ted Leo and the Pharmacists albums
Lookout! Records albums